New Paltz may refer to:  

 New Paltz, New York, a town in New York
 New Paltz (village), New York, contained entirely within the town
 State University of New York at New Paltz